Roland Wallace Burris (born August 3, 1937) is an American politician and attorney who is a former United States Senator from the state of Illinois and a member of the Democratic Party.

In 1978, Burris was the first African American elected to statewide office in Illinois, when he was elected Illinois Comptroller. He served in that office until his election as Illinois Attorney General in 1990. Since then, he has unsuccessfully run for office four more times.

Illinois Governor Rod Blagojevich appointed Burris to replace President-elect Barack Obama as the junior senator from Illinois. The appointment was controversial, as the governor was already under investigation and there were rumors of his being paid for the appointment. Burris succeeded Obama as the U.S. Senate's only African American member. He was briefly a candidate for election to a full term but withdrew before the Democratic primaries in the 2010 elections.

Personal life and education

Burris was born and raised in the small community of Centralia in southern Illinois. The Burris family can trace their roots to American slaves in the American South, mainly in the states of Georgia, South Carolina and Tennessee. He was a 1955 graduate of Centralia High School. He attended Southern Illinois University Carbondale, receiving a Bachelor of Arts degree in political science in 1959. He was an exchange student on scholarship to study International Law at the University of Hamburg in Germany. He earned his Juris Doctor degree from the Howard University School of Law in 1963.

Burris is married to Berlean M. Burris and is the father of two adult children, Rolanda S. Burris, and Roland W. Burris II. He also has a grandson, Roland T. Burris.

Burris has built a mausoleum for himself in Oak Woods Cemetery on Chicago's South Side. His tombstone reads "TRAIL BLAZER" and includes a list of his accomplishments, with space left for future ones.

Early career
   The adversities he faced as an African-American bank examiner in the early 1960s were described in some detail in the February 2013 edition of SuperVisions (the OCC's employee newsletter).  

 

In 1985, Burris was selected for the position of Vice-Chairman of the Democratic National Committee. This decision, coming on the heels of the party's landslide loss to President Ronald Reagan, generated controversy, since Gary, Indiana Mayor Richard Hatcher, who had served as the campaign manager for presidential candidate Jesse Jackson, was the nominee of the party's Black Caucus. Jackson harshly criticized the party's actions, and refused to recognize Burris's selection, claiming that it was part of an effort by the Democratic Party leadership to pander to the white American electorate.

State politics
Burris sought the Democratic nomination for the office of Illinois Comptroller in 1976, but was defeated by Michael Bakalis. In 1978 Bakalis did not seek re-election as Comptroller, choosing to run for Governor and Burris won the Comptrollership. He was re-elected as Comptroller in 1982 and 1986. He was the first African American to be elected to a statewide office in the state of Illinois.  who went on to defeat incumbent Republican Senator Charles Percy.

He was elected Illinois Attorney General in 1990, serving from 1991 to 1995, where he supervised over 500 lawyers. There, he was the second African American ever to be elected to a state office of attorney general in the United States (after Edward Brooke). In 1985, 19-year-old Rolando Cruz was tried, convicted, and sentenced to death along with a co-defendant in a DuPage County Circuit Court, for the kidnapping, rape, and murder of a 10-year-old child. In 1992, Assistant Attorney General Mary Brigid Kenney, whom Burris had assigned to fight Cruz's appeal, sent Burris a memo identifying numerous errors in the investigation and trial in Cruz's initial conviction, and refusing to participate in upholding what she considered to be a wrongful conviction. Burris ignored Kenney's warnings, and she resigned in protest, writing to Burris, "I was being asked to help execute an innocent man... Unfortunately, you have seen fit to ignore the evidence in this case."
In September 1995, DNA tests showed that neither Cruz nor his co-defendant were the contributors of the semen found at the crime scene, thus exonerating them. In 2002 Governor George Ryan fully pardoned Cruz, and went on to declare a moratorium on the death penalty in Illinois, asserting that the system was "fraught with error".

In 1993, Burris, an advocate for a national handgun ban, helped to organize Chicago's first Gun Turn-in Day. The following year, Burris admitted that he kept a handgun in his home and had not turned it into police as he had urged others to do. A spokesman stated that Burris had "forgotten about" his handgun.

In 1995, Burris ran as an independent for mayor of Chicago, losing to incumbent Richard M. Daley. In 1998, he again unsuccessfully sought the Democratic Party nomination for Governor of Illinois. In that race, Burris caused a controversy by referring to his Democratic primary opponents — Jim Burns, Glenn Poshard (who eventually won the nomination) and John Schmidt — as "nonqualified white boys." During his 2002 run for governor against, among others, Rod Blagojevich, he was supported by, among others, Barack Obama.

IFDA scandal
In the 1980s as Illinois State Comptroller, Burris's office issued a license to the Illinois Funeral Directors Association (IFDA) to manage a pre-need funeral trust fund. A provision was also issued allowing trustees to take 25% of the fund's earnings as management fees.

The fund went into deficits beginning in 2001 leading to a revocation of the IFDA license in September 2007 and a $59 million deficit by October 2008. Burris acted as a lobbyist for the IFDA trust during early 2007 through 2008. Burris has refused comment on the scandal citing "it was 30 years ago". Consequently, a group of funeral directors (plaintiffs in a suit filed January 2009 against the IFDA alleging a Ponzi scheme) have subpoenaed Burris to find out his involvement during his time as lobbyist.

Career outside politics
Burris is manager/CEO of Burris & Lebed Consulting, LLC, which was formed in April 2002.

U.S. Senate

Senate appointment

On December 14, 2008, Burris suggested himself as a possible caretaker for the United States Senate seat vacated by President-elect Barack Obama, saying he would not run for reelection if appointed. Prior to this suggestion, Governor Blagojevich had been considering asking Oprah Winfrey but feared she would not take his call. This suggestion came in the wake of an FBI investigation regarding charges of corruption against the Governor for seeking bribes in a pay-to-play scheme for the empty Senate seat and other offenses. Blagojevich says he appointed Burris because he believed Burris's ego made him the only person who would fight to be seated.

Burris filed an affidavit on January 5, in advance of his testimony before the Illinois impeachment committee, in which he wrote that "prior to the December 26, 2008, telephone call from Mr. Adams Jr., there was not any contact between myself or any of my representatives with Governor Blagojevich or any of his representatives regarding my appointment to the United States Senate." However, according to the FBI wiretap transcript recorded November 13, Burris told Rob Blagojevich, who was the chairman of the ex-governor's reelection campaign, that he understood that Blagojevich wanted money and that he was "trying to figure out how to deal with this and still be in the consideration for the appointment," and that he was willing to "personally do something," including offering to give the governor a personal check. He realized, however, that such an action might look like he was trying to buy the seat and wanted to find a way to avoid that perception.

On December 30, 2008, Governor Blagojevich announced that he was naming Burris to the seat. Illinois Secretary of State Jesse White registered the appointment in the official records of Illinois on December 31, 2008. However, White declined to sign the Senate's certification form.

On January 5, 2009, Secretary of the United States Senate Nancy Erickson rejected Burris's certificate of appointment to the Senate as invalid. Erickson cited Senate Rule 2 as the reason for the rejection. Because White had refused to sign the certificate, Erickson concluded in her findings that the certificate did not conform to Senate Rule 2. Senate Majority Leader Harry Reid and Illinois's senior Senator Dick Durbin agreed with Erickson that the Senate rule required the secretary of state's signature.

Reid initially said that the Senate would not seat Burris, citing Article I, Section 5 of the United States Constitution, which states that "Each House shall be the Judge of the Elections, Returns and Qualifications of its own Members." Reid and other senators had previously stated, before Burris was in contention, that they would use Article I authority against any appointment by Blagojevich. The Senate also could have referred the appointment to the Senate Rules Committee, thus stalling it until Blagojevich's status was settled. Some Democrats, including the chairwoman of the Senate Rules Committee, Dianne Feinstein, and the Congressional Black Caucus, spoke out in favor of Burris being seated.

Burris appeared in Washington at the January Congressional swearing-in ceremony (January 6) to claim his seat, but was denied entry into the Senate chambers. Burris and his lawyers insisted that Burris was "now the junior senator from the state of Illinois," although technically he was not a senator and could not be one until being administered the oath of office.

On January 9, 2009, the Illinois Supreme Court ruled that the appointment only required the signature of the governor and the secretary of state's signature is not required to make the appointment valid. It also said Illinois is not obligated to use, and hence its Secretary of State is not required to sign, the Senate's "recommended" certification form. The State Supreme Court noted that a different form was available: White had already registered the appointment in Illinois's official records, and Illinois law requires the Secretary of State to provide a certified copy, with signature and seal, of any of the state's official records to anyone willing to pay the fee. It suggested that Burris simply obtain a certified copy of the appointment registration. In its Burris v. White ruling the State Supreme Court not only declared that the form of certificate contained in rule II of the Standing Rules of the United States Senate was, according to its own terms, only a recommended form but it further remarked that "no explanation has been given as to how any rule of the Senate, whether it be formal or merely a matter of tradition, could supersede the authority to fill vacancies conferred on the states by the federal constitution". Following the ruling, White provided Burris with a certified copy of the appointment's registration, and Burris delivered that copy, bearing the State Seal, to the Secretary of the Senate. On January 12, 2009, after the Secretary of the Senate announced that she and the Senate Parliamentarian deemed Burris's new credentials valid, Senate leaders decided to seat Burris. Burris was sworn in by Vice President Dick Cheney on January 15, 2009.

Burris filed an affidavit with the Illinois House committee that oversaw Governor Blagojevich's impeachment, dated February 4, to supplement his earlier answer to a question posed by the committee. Burris acknowledged Rod Blagojevich requested "assistance in fund-raising" for the governor three times in the weeks and months before Blagojevich appointed Burris. Illinois House Republicans consider this to be at odds with Burris's testimony during the impeachment trial, and said they were considering pursuing a perjury investigation. Democratic officials, including Illinois Attorney General Lisa Madigan, supported an investigation. Burris stated that he told the governor's brother Rob Blagojevich that he could not donate to Gov. Blagojevich because "it could be viewed as an attempt to curry favor with him regarding his decision to appoint a successor to President Obama" and that he "did not raise or donate any funds to Governor Blagojevich after the fundraiser on June 27, 2008."

On February 16, in comments to reporters, Burris told reporters that the governor's brother had asked him to raise ten- to fifteen-thousand dollars for the governor in October 2008. Burris said that after the phone call, he "talked to some people about trying to see if we could put a fundraiser on," but that no one was willing to donate to the governor. Burris says he spoke again with the governor's brother around November 10 to tell him that his earlier efforts to raise money were unsuccessful, but that he might be able to talk other people into donating about a thousand dollars to the governor. Burris also said that around November 15 or 16, he told the governor's brother that he could not raise any money for the governor, nor would he donate to the governor himself.

On February 17, Sangamon County State's Attorney's Office released a statement saying that it was investigating Burris for possible perjury charges connected to his testimony to the panel of the Illinois House of Representatives investigating the governor's impeachment. The Senate Ethics Committee also reportedly was preparing a preliminary investigation into the matter.

On February 18, the Chicago Tribune, the state's largest newspaper, called on Burris to resign. In the editorial, the board wrote, "His protests that he had nothing to hide just don't square with his obvious attempts to hide something." The editorial board of The Washington Post also called for his resignation saying Burris's story has more twists than the Chicago 'L' because Burris had offered five varying explanations, three of them under oath, of his contacts with associates of Blagojevich. Burris refused to resign his seat, despite calls to do so from new Illinois governor Pat Quinn and statements from fellow Illinois Senator Dick Durbin that Durbin would not support a Burris election bid.

On March 7, the Chicago Sun-Times reported that Sangamon County State's Attorney John Schmidt has asked the FBI for tapes of wiretapped phone calls between Burris and Rod Blagojevich, which he would use for his investigation of whether to charge Burris with perjury. On May 26, 2009, tapes were released from the wire taps. Roland Burris promised to "personally do something" for Blagojevich's campaign. During the conversation, Burris and Blagojevich discussed the possibility that Burris might raise campaign money on a larger scale, saying "I know I could give him a check myself."

The Associated Press reported a few days after the revelation: "When asked in a recent interview with The Associated Press how the scandal back home has affected him, Burris made a sweeping gesture with his hands and literally brushed the matter aside."

On May 28, 2009, Democratic Illinois Rep. Jack Franks and Republican Rep. Jim Durkin, the ranking Republican on the impeachment panel who had questioned Burris during his January 8 testimony, claimed that Burris committed perjury and called for him to be removed from office. In 2009, Senator Burris was named one of the 15 Most Corrupt Members of Congress by the watchdog group Citizens for Responsibility and Ethics in Washington.

Sangamon County State's Attorney John Schmidt announced on June 19, 2009, that Burris would not face criminal perjury charges, stating that Burris's promise to "personally do something" for Governor Blagojevich was too vague to rise to the level of criminality, as it could be interpreted in too many different ways. Burris praised the announcement, saying, "The truth has prevailed"; meanwhile, Durkin criticized Schmidt's decision, saying, "They're all contradictions to his previously sworn statements. To me, it's a pretty strong case."

The Senate Ethics Committee issued a letter on November 20, 2009, admonishing him saying that although no ethics charges would be pursued, "The Committee found that you should have known that you were providing incorrect, inconsistent, misleading, or incomplete information to the public, the Senate and those conducting legitimate inquiries into your appointment to the Senate."

Senate term

Just as Revels, Bruce, Brooke, Braun, and Obama had been the Senate's only African American member, Burris was the only black Senator during his term in office. Following his leaving office, it would be over two years until the next black Senator, Tim Scott, a Republican, and the first black senator elected in the south since Reconstruction, took office in January 2013.

Committee assignments

Committee on Armed Services
Subcommittee on Airland
Subcommittee on Personnel
Subcommittee on Readiness and Management Support
Committee on Homeland Security and Governmental Affairs
Subcommittee on Federal Financial Management, Government Information, Federal Services and International Security
Subcommittee on Oversight of Government Management, the Federal Workforce, and the District of Columbia
Ad Hoc Subcommittee on Disaster Recovery
Committee on Veterans' Affairs

2010 election campaign plans

According to Federal Election Commission records, on January 2, 2009, prior to the controversy regarding his conflicting explanations of his fundraising activity on behalf of Blagojevich, Burris signed a statement of candidacy for the 2010 election. Durbin stated that "it would be extremely difficult for him to be successful", and on April 16, the Chicago Tribune reported that Burris had raised only $845 for his campaign. On July 9, the Chicago Sun-Times reported that Senator Burris would not run for election to a full 6-year term in 2010, and Burris made an official announcement in Chicago on July 10 that he would retire when his replacement term ended. Burris's term ended on November 29, 2010, with the swearing-in of his elected successor, Mark Kirk, who had won election to the unexpired term, not just to the full 6-year term. Burris cited the high cost of running a campaign as a major reason for not seeking election, saying he would rather continue to serve the people of Illinois than try to raise money for a campaign.

See also
 List of African-American firsts
 List of African-American United States senators
 Powell v. McCormack

References

External links

 

 Senate website (Archived)

|-

|-

|-

1937 births
21st-century American politicians
African-American lawyers
African-American people in Illinois politics
African-American United States senators
Baptists from Illinois
Comptrollers of Illinois
Democratic Party United States senators from Illinois
Howard University School of Law alumni
Illinois Attorneys General
Illinois Democrats
Living people
State cabinet secretaries of Illinois
People from Centralia, Illinois
Politicians from Chicago
Southern Illinois University Carbondale alumni
21st-century African-American politicians
20th-century African-American people